The 1982 European Taekwondo Championships were held in Rome Italy between September  23 and 27, 1982 under the organization of the European Taekwondo Union (ETU) and Italian Taekwondo Federation.

Medal table

Medal summary

Men

Women

References

External links 
 European Taekwondo Union

1982 in taekwondo
European Taekwondo Championships
International sports competitions hosted by Italy
1982 in European sport
1982 in Italian sport